'Get Out the Door" is the third and final single from Velvet Revolver's second album Libertad, released in January 29, 2008. This song is about a transgender woman. Also, the song's solo features the use of a talk box by lead guitarist Slash. This also their last single prior their disbandment following Weiland's departure less than three months after this single was released.

Song history
It is the third single from Libertad, after "She Builds Quick Machines" and "The Last Fight". The band's official website started a poll on which track, out of "Let It Roll", "She Mine" and "Get Out the Door", to decide which song should be chosen as to be released as the third single. "Get Out the Door" won with 53.3% of the votes.

By coincidence, the appropriately titled song was the last song by the band to feature singer Scott Weiland before his departure from the band.

Music video
The music video for "Get Out the Door" was directed by Dean Karr. The Director of Photography for the video was Rocco Guarino. Rocco filmed concert footage of the band and took photos throughout the course of their career, then Dean used this footage to assemble a performance video.

Track listing
 "Get Out the Door" – 3:14

Personnel
Scott Weiland - lead vocals, keyboards
Slash - lead guitar, talkbox
Duff McKagan - bass, backing vocals
Matt Sorum - drums, percussion, backing vocals
Dave Kushner - rhythm guitar

References

External links

2008 singles
Velvet Revolver songs
Songs written by Scott Weiland
Songs written by Slash (musician)
Songs written by Matt Sorum
Songs written by Duff McKagan
Song recordings produced by Brendan O'Brien (record producer)
2007 songs
Songs written by Dave Kushner
LGBT-related songs
RCA Records singles